Chad Lamont Butler (December 29, 1973 – December 4, 2007), better known by his stage name Pimp C, was an American rapper and record producer. He was best known for his work with Bun B as one half of the hip-hop duo Underground Kingz (UGK).

Signing to Jive Records in 1992, UGK released their major-label debut album Too Hard to Swallow to critical acclaim. The group followed this with their second and third major-label albums Super Tight in 1994 and Ridin' Dirty in 1996, both of which charted in the Billboard 200 to further success. The group received national attention in 2000 after being featured on Jay-Z's hit single "Big Pimpin'", which peaked at #18 on the Billboard Hot 100 and #1 on the Rhythmic Top 40.

The group went on hiatus for the first half of the 2000s after Pimp C was sentenced to eight years in prison for a probation violation. During this time both members pursued solo careers, with Pimp C releasing his solo debut, The Sweet James Jones Stories, in 2005, composed of material recorded prior to his sentencing. After being released from prison in December 2005, he released his second solo album, Pimpalation, in 2006. UGK released their eponymous fifth studio album in 2007, which spawned the hit single "International Players Anthem (I Choose You)" featuring OutKast, which peaked at #70 on the Billboard Hot 100.

Pimp C was found dead in his hotel room on December 4, 2007, with a coroner's report attributing his death to complications stemming from heavy consumption of purple drank and his pre-existing condition of sleep apnea.

Early life 
Chad Lamont Butler was born December 29, 1973, in Crowley, Louisiana, but was raised in Port Arthur, Texas. Butler was the only child of Charleston Butler and Weslyn "Mama Wes" Butler Jacob Monroe. Butler was born prematurely and had numerous health issues, including a birth defect that caused his legs to point inward, which required braces to fix. He also had to be propped up when he slept due to digestive problems. His eyesight was poor, and he almost went blind after a severe bout of pinkeye. Butler also had pneumonia at least nine times as a child.

As the son of a trumpet player, Butler had an interest in music since childhood: "I come from a classical background, I came up singing Italian sonnets, Negro spirituals, and shit of that nature." Even before studying musical notation in school, he learned to play many instruments by ear, including piano, trumpet, drums and flugelhorn. His vocal style was once described as "high-voiced, unstable and provocateur, as likely to slap your face as to sing you a love song." Influenced by Run-DMC, he started synthesizing beats to rap over after receiving a drum machine and keyboard one Christmas.

Butler joined the choir as a teenager and played numerous instruments at school, and after being encouraged by his stepfather Bill Monroe, began writing and creating his own music. Butler was particularly interested in the emerging hip hop genre as a child, and soon bonded and became friends with Bernard "Bun B" Freeman over their shared passion for music.

Music career

UGK

Early career (1987–1996)

Butler formed the rap group Underground Kingz (often referred to as UGK) with friend Bernard "Bun B" Freeman in 1987 in Port Arthur, Texas. Initially signed to independent label Big Tyme Recordz, the duo released two EPs, The Southern Way and Banned, in 1992 to moderate local success, which lead to the group being signed to Jive Records later that year. In November, they released their major label debut, Too Hard to Swallow through Jive, which peaked at #37 on the US Top R&B/Hip-Hop Albums chart.

UGK's second album, Super Tight was released in 1994 to critical acclaim and commercial success, charting at #95 on the Billboard 200 and #9 on the Top R&B/Hip-Hop Albums chart. In 1996, UGK's third album, Ridin' Dirty, became their most successful, reaching #2 on the Billboard Top R&B/Hip-Hop Albums chart and #15 on the Billboard 200, receiving widespread critical acclaim and commercial success, having sold 850,000 copies to date.

Hiatus and national attention (1996–2001)
After taking a short hiatus from music in the late 1990s, UGK returned in 2000, appearing on Jay-Z's smash hit single "Big Pimpin'", which peaked at #18 on the Billboard 200, as well as "Sippin' on Some Syrup" by Three 6 Mafia, which peaked at #30 on the US Hot R&B/Hip-Hop Songs. Both of these collaborations greatly increased the duo's reputation, and helped fuel anticipation for their next project. Jive Records failed to capitalize on this new-found interest in UGK, as their fourth album, Dirty Money, was released in 2001 with little to no advertisement or promotion.

Prison sentence and solo career (2002–2006)

After Pimp C was sentenced to eight years in prison in August 2002, UGK was once again forced to go on hiatus, which led to both members pursuing solo careers. Pimp C's debut studio album, The Sweet James Jones Stories was released in March 2005, composed of material recorded prior to Pimp C's incarceration. After being released from prison in December 2005, Pimp C released his second solo studio album Pimpalation in July 2006 and peaked at #3 on the US Billboard 200 and topped the US Hot R&B/Hip-Hop Albums chart.

UGK Reunited

On August 7, 2007, UGK reunited to release their eponymous fifth studio album, debuting at #1 on both the Billboard 200 and Hot R&B/Hip-Hop charts. The album was the last UGK album released during Pimp C's lifetime, and spawned the hit single "International Players Anthem (I Choose You)", and received universal acclaim from critics.

Personal life

Butler married his wife, Chinara, while he was in prison in 2003. They had one child together, a daughter named Christian, and he had two older sons, Chad Lamont Butler II and Dahcory Butler, both of whom were born in previous relationships.

Legal issues
On December 16, 2000, Butler was arrested in Houston's Sharpstown Mall after allegedly holding a woman, Lakita Hulett, at gunpoint and threatening to shoot her after a confrontation in a shoe store. After both Butler and Hulett had exchanged words in the store, Hulett alleged that Butler pushed a gun into her side and said, "Bitch, I'll shoot you," before she ran away and informed police. Butler claimed he simply lifted his jacket to show the gun and did not remove it from his waistband.

As Butler attempted to exit the mall and enter his car, numerous officers surrounded him and instructed him to surrender. Butler ignored the orders and was forced to the ground by officers, who handcuffed him and brought him back into the mall. Shortly after, Butler was transported to Houston Central Jail where he was charged with aggravated assault with a deadly weapon. Butler claimed police used excessive force to restrain him, and alleged they knocked him unconscious twice and refused to let doctors at a local hospital perform a routine CT scan, instead transporting him straight to jail.

Butler posted $10,000 bail the following day and was initially sentenced to probation after pleading no contest in early 2001. He was sent back to prison in January 2002 after failing to report to his probation officer on several occasions, failing to keep up with his community service hours or pay outstanding court fees, as well as testing positive twice for marijuana. On August 5, 2002, Butler was sentenced to eight years in prison.

His arrest was widely protested by the hip-hop community, who along with Bun B immediately initiated a grassroots "Free Pimp C" campaign. Butler spent the later portion of his sentence at the Terrell Unit in Brazoria County, Texas and was transferred to the Huntsville Unit a week prior to his release. On December 30, 2005, Butler was released from prison and placed on parole until December 2009.

Death 
In early December 2007, Butler had been staying at the Mondrian Hotel in West Hollywood, California, where he had been working on new music and performing with Too $hort. On the morning of December 4, 2007, he was scheduled to fly back home, where his wife, Chinara, was waiting with his cousin Ed at the airport to pick him up. After not hearing from him the morning of the scheduled flight, his wife called the hotel and requested that they check on him. Hotel staff discovered Butler unresponsive in his hotel room, where he was pronounced dead shortly after. He was 33 at the time of his death.

The coroner's report ruled that his death was accidental, attributing it to the effects of Butler's heavy usage of "purple drank", a combination of codeine and promethazine, in conjunction with his pre-existing condition of sleep apnea. Like many other Southern rappers, Pimp C referred to purple drank many times in his music.

According to DJ Paul of Three 6 Mafia, he got a call from Pimp C's manager, Rick Martin, who saw Pimp C's body in the hotel room, saying: "He was laying down like he was praying but there was blood around like he was shot. They thought he was shot in the head, but they didn't know what the hell happened because there was blood everywhere. They thought he was shot. He was knelt down like he was praying and the candles were all the way burnt down, so they knew he'd probably been dead for a day or so because he always lit those candles to sleep. He lit those big tall candles and they had been burnt down so he probably was dead for a while."

Butler's body was transported back to his hometown of Port Arthur, Texas, shortly after. His funeral was held at the Bob Bowers Civic Center in Port Arthur on December 13, 2007. Port Arthur Mayor Deloris Prince, Pimp C's mother Weslyn Monroe, and Bun B were among the speakers at the service.

Tributes 
Numerous rappers paid tribute to Pimp C in the wake of his passing. Bun B has continued to honor Pimp C through his music, including on the tracks "You're Everything" and "Pop It 4 Pimp" from his 2008 album II Trill, and released the final UGK album, UGK 4 Life, in 2009. Lil' Flip released a tribute song, "RIP Pimp C", two days after his death in 2007. A$AP Rocky cites Pimp C as one of his major influences, and has paid tribute to him many times through his music. Megan Thee Stallion named her 2018 EP Tina Snow in honor of Pimp C's alter ego Tony Snow.

Discography

Studio albums 
 The Sweet James Jones Stories (2005)
 Pimpalation (2006)

Posthumous studio albums 
 The Naked Soul of Sweet Jones (2010)
 Still Pimping (2011)
 Long Live the Pimp (2015)

Documentaries
Pimpalation - Return of the Trill Rap-A-Lot/Wood Wheel Records/REL Entertainment (2006)
The Final Chapter Rap-A-Lot/Wood Wheel Records/REL Entertainment (2008)

References

External links 

 Official website
 

1973 births
2007 deaths
20th-century American businesspeople
20th-century American musicians
21st-century American businesspeople
21st-century American musicians
Accidental deaths in California
African-American businesspeople
African-American male rappers
African-American record producers
American businesspeople convicted of crimes
American hip hop record producers
American hip hop singers
American music industry executives
American people convicted of assault
Asylum Records artists
Businesspeople from Texas
Drug-related deaths in California
Gangsta rappers
People from Port Arthur, Texas
Rappers from Houston
Rappers from Texas
Southern hip hop musicians
Record producers from Texas
20th-century American male musicians
21st-century American male musicians
20th-century African-American musicians
21st-century African-American musicians